Deweyville is a census-designated place (CDP) in Newton County, on the central eastern border of Texas, United States. The population was 571 at the 2020 census, down from 1,023 at the 2010 census.

Geography
Deweyville is located at  (30.296478, -93.749441).

Historical development

This settlement was established in 1898 as a sawmill site by the Sabine Tram Company, which had a logging operation. It was named after George Dewey, an admiral in the United States Navy who was victorious in the Battle of Manila Bay in the Spanish–American War in the Philippines that same year. Within two years a post office would be established. For a short time this town was the largest in Newton County. Electricity was installed for the residents of Deweyville in the 1920s.

The original settlement was called "Possum Bluff". It was purchased by Pierre Lavine from Bill Morrison, for a team of oxen in 1886. A Texas Historical Marker was erected in 1967 on Highway 12 near the Texas / Louisiana border stating this information. The marker was later moved to the front of the Deweyville Public Library.

Demographics

As of the 2020 United States census, there were 571 people, 253 households, and 201 families residing in the CDP.

As of the census of 2000, there were 1,190 people, 459 households, and 325 families residing in the CDP. The population density was 105.9 people per square mile (40.9/km2). There were 528 housing units at an average density of 47.0/sq mi (18.1/km2). The racial makeup of the CDP was 98.40% White, 0.42% Native American, 0.17% Asian, 0.17% from other races, and 0.84% from two or more races. Hispanic or Latino of any race were 0.84% of the population.

There were 459 households, out of which 32.0% had children under the age of 18 living with them, 59.3% were married couples living together, 7.4% had a female householder with no husband present, and 29.0% were non-families. 24.4% of all households were made up of individuals, and 10.2% had someone living alone who was 65 years of age or older. The average household size was 2.59 and the average family size was 3.11.

In the CDP, the population was spread out, with 26.2% under the age of 18, 8.8% from 18 to 24, 28.7% from 25 to 44, 25.1% from 45 to 64, and 11.1% who were 65 years of age or older. The median age was 35 years. For every 100 females, there were 101.0 males. For every 100 females age 18 and over, there were 95.5 males.

The median income for a household in the CDP was $30,714, and the median income for a family was $35,150. Males had a median income of $35,250 versus $15,852 for females. The per capita income for the CDP was $13,136. About 13.5% of families and 17.8% of the population were below the poverty line, including 25.2% of those under age 18 and 7.4% of those age 65 or over.

Climate
The climate in this area is characterized by hot, humid summers and generally mild to cool winters.  According to the Köppen Climate Classification system, Deweyville has a humid subtropical climate, abbreviated "Cfa" on climate maps.

2016 flooding

Over 5000 homes were flooded in Deweyville and the surrounding area, to include parts of Louisiana along the Sabine River, during the month of March 2016. The flooding was caused by torrential rains and the release of water from the Toledo Bend Reservoir.

References

External links
 

Census-designated places in Newton County, Texas
Census-designated places in Texas
Logging communities in the United States